Chuck Chicken (Kung Fu Chicken in China) is a Flash animated television series created by Animasia Studios. The story takes place on a bird-filled island of Rocky Perch, and tells the story of Chuck who turns into "Kung Fu Chicken", providing Kung Fu-style security and protection to the citizens of the island. When Chuck inherits a very special amulet in the shape of a golden egg with amazing powers, he uses it to defeat evil to protect the island of planet bird, which looks like planet Earth but with birds instead of humans).

The show has 52 episodes and is in Cantonese, English, Bahasa Malaysia, Vietnamese, Mandarin, Bahasa Indonesia, and Thai. Eleven years after its debut, the show was dubbed into Korean for the first time and aired on JEI TV. Originally, 52 episodes were released in 2010, with 11 minutes each for Season 1. It was made possible by the funding provided by the Malaysian Government under the Ministry of Communication and Multimedia, and it took Animasia Studio approximately 18 months for production by 100 Malaysian creative talents. Netflix had also picked up the show and was playing it worldwide. However, this show has been removed from Netflix.

Plot

Characters
 Chuck Adoodledoo — Chuck Adoodledoo inherited Golden Egg Securities from the master who disappeared via mysterious circumstances, and has made it his mission to find him again. Chuck is the clumsiest chicken on Rocky Perch Island, and the least likely hero you'd ever meet. That was, until he received the master's mystical talisman, an object that bestows the wearer with amazing Kung Fu abilities. In the guise of his alter ego, Kung Fu Chicken, he protects the inhabitants of Rocky Perch from Dr. Mingo and the many other villains that lurk around the island. In his role as Kung Fu Chicken, Chuck has many amazing abilities, but still relies on his best friends, Flick and Wing, to get him out of trouble when things go wrong, and since they go wrong frequently, Flick and Wing are kept very busy indeed.
 Flick Feathers — Flick Feathers is a beautiful, feisty white Dove with attitude. She's the real “brain” of the team and the character that is most likely to find a solution, or come up with a brilliant plan to save the day. Flick treats her work very seriously, and likes to be diligent in everything she does. Unfortunately, she works with two of the messiest, clumsiest birds on Rocky Perch island: her two best friends, Chuck and Wing. Flick is a Kung Fu expert with incredible speed and acrobatic abilities that she often uses to get her friends out of trouble. Flick is also an expert with her throwing ring, a device that she can hurl with pinpoint accuracy.
 Wing Span — Wing Span is an outgoing, friendly Hornbill, and the dreamer of the group. H's also an enthusiastic, amateur inventor, who is forever building strange devices that never actually work in the way he originally intended. Although he's a little scatty, it doesn't stop this optimistic bird from creating even more hair-brained contraptions to aid him and his friends in their security work. Wings is the shortest, stockiest member of the team, and like his friends, he's a Kung Fu expert. Wing uses his gadget-packed wooden staff to make up for his lack of height and maneuverability.
 Dee, Don and Dex (Cy-ducks) — Dee, Don and Dex are a family of ducks that have been cyber-enhanced with robotic technology, making each duck super strong and super fast. Dee is one of Chuck Chicken's archenemies, who had been searching & researching the Magic Egg for years, and his brothers Don and Dex are on a mission to be the richest birds on Rocky Perch Island. However, to do this they've got to be able to successfully steal valuables from under the noses of Golden Egg Securities. They first appear at 'The Magic Egg'. In the episodes "Laughing Gas" and "Dexenstein", they team up with the Mad Scientistingos.
 Dr. Mingo — Dr Mingo is another of Chuck Chicken's archenemies and a criminal mastermind when it comes to technology. He's a megalomaniac, out to rule the island of Rocky Perch and its inhabitants, and uses his incredible creations to perform spectacular robberies. Dr. Mingo is a bad-tempered character that turned his back on his peace loving Flamingo family to pursue a life of crime. He doesn't like the colour pink, and hates any jokes or reference to his pink feathers. Dr Mingo inhabits a secret laboratory in the center of the island's dormant volcano with his two Hench-birds Pen and Guin. Since Golden Egg Securities have started foiling his crimes, Dr. Mingo has become obsessed with finally capturing that pesky hero, Kung Fu Chicken, and his meddling friends.
 Pen and Guin — Pen and Guin are a pair of mischievous twin penguins that work for Dr Mingo. The terrible twins come from the Antarctic, but miss the cold so much, they have to wear specially constructed suits that keep them nice and cold at all times. They also wield Ray Guns that freeze their opponents into solid blocks of ice. They appear at 6 episodes, with Dr Mingo.
 Sinister Emperor - A bad vulture who first appears at "The Road of Danger". When Chuck banished him, he got his new power. The Black Egg. He got defeated by Chuck in the episode "Return of the Sinister Emperor" because Chuck's gold egg was 1000 times powerful.

Powers

Chuck is able to use twelve super powers while using the magic egg:

 Rhino Strength — Gives Chuck super-strength.
 Speeding Cheetah — Gives Chuck the ability to run at super-speed and also gives him super-human reflexes.
 Minuscule Mouse — Shrinks Chuck into a tiny form which allows him to enter and travel through tiny holes.
 Eight-armed Spider   — Gives Chuck the ability to stick to walls and shoot webbing from his wrists.
 Winding Snake  — Gives Chuck rubber-like powers, so that he can bend, squash, stretch and shape-shift into all sorts of different forms.
 Spinning Mole — Enables him to spin rapidly to tunnel underground, literally turning him into a digging machine.
 Armadillo Armor — Transforms his feathers into indestructible Armadillo-like armor.
 Soaring Eagle  — Gives Chuck telescopic vision.
 Leaping Toadfish  — This power gives Chuck fish scales, webbed feet, and the ability to breath underwater.
 Phasing Bat — Chuck can grow huge super-sensitive bat ears that can give him super-hearing .
 Invisible Chameleon  — Helps Chuck turn invisible to follow enemies or help sneak around enemy areas.
 Smokey Skunk — Chuck farts a toxic smog that gives him the chance to escape from unwanted or dangerous battles, or to subdue enemies quickly.

Sinister Emperor is able to use super powers while using the black egg:

 Power of the Thundercloud/Lightning - Sinister Emperor turns into a thundercloud unleashing lightning
 Power of the Tornado/Hurricane - Gives Sinister Emperor the power of the tornado or a hurricane
 Power of the Meteoroid - Combines various rocks to turn himself a meteor

Episodes

Collaboration

Animasia Studio have also collaborated with Sasbadi Holdings Berhad to produce Chuck Chicken Books and Games for sale and distribution worldwide.  In addition, the books such as Colouring Books and Comic Books will have Augmented Reality (AR) Technology embedded inside.

Current broadcasters

External links

References 

2010s animated television series
Flash television shows
Malaysian children's animated action television series
Malaysian children's animated adventure television series
Malaysian children's animated comedy television series
Malaysian children's animated superhero television series
Television series about chickens